The Jungbunaeryuk Line is a rail line under construction from Bubal to Mungyeong. Construction started in November 2015. The line opened in December 2021 between Bubal on the Gyeonggang Line & Chungju on the Chungbuk Line. The KTX line is expected to be extended in December 2024 from Chungju to Mungyeong. Another extension from Mungyeong to Gimcheon was approved in December 2022.

Stations

Services 
KTX-Eum will be operated in this line 4 times a day from December 31, 2021.

References
 
 
 

Rail transport in Gyeonggi Province
Korail lines